The 2018–19 Croatian First Football League (officially Hrvatski Telekom Prva liga for sponsorship reasons) was the 28th season of the Croatian First Football League, the national championship for men's association football teams in Croatia, since its establishment in 1992. The season started on 27 July 2018 and finished on 26 May 2019.

The league was contested by ten teams.

Teams
On 23 April 2018, Croatian Football Federation announced that the first stage of licensing procedure for 2018–19 season was complete. For the 2018–19 Prva HNL, only eight clubs were issued a top level license: Dinamo Zagreb, Gorica, Hajduk Split, Inter Zaprešić, Lokomotiva, Osijek, Rijeka and Slaven Belupo. All of these clubs except Gorica were also issued a license for participating in UEFA competitions. In the second stage of licensing, clubs that were not licensed in the first stage could appeal on the decision.

Stadia and locations

 1 Lokomotiva and Rudeš host their home matches at Stadion Kranjčevićeva as their own ground failed to get license for top level football. The stadium is originally the home ground of third-level side NK Zagreb.

Personnel and kits

Managerial changes

League table

Results
Each team played home-and-away against every other team in the league twice, for a total of 36 matches each played.

First round

Second round

Relegation play-offs
At the end of the season, ninth-placed team Istra 1961 contested a two-legged relegation play-off tie against Šibenik, runners-up of the 2018–19 Croatian Second Football League.

First leg

Second leg

Istra 1961 won 3–1 on aggregate.

Statistics

Top scorers

Awards

Annual awards

References

External links
Official website 
Prva HNL at UEFA.com

2018-19
2018–19 in Croatian football
2018–19 in European association football leagues